The Attorney General of New South Wales, in formal contexts also Attorney-General or Attorney General for New South Wales  and usually known simply as the Attorney General, is a minister in the Government of New South Wales who has responsibility for the administration of justice in New South Wales, Australia. In addition, the attorney general is one of the Law Officers of the Crown. Along with the subordinate Solicitor General, Crown Advocate, and Crown Solicitor, the attorney general serves as the chief legal and constitutional adviser of the Crown and Government of New South Wales.

The current attorney general, since 30 January 2017, is Mark Speakman, . The attorney general is supported in the administration of his portfolio by the following ministers, all appointed with effect from 21 December 2021: 
 the Minister for Police, currently Paul Toole
 the Minister for Women and Minister for Mental Health, currently Bronnie Taylor
 the Minister for Veterans, currently David Elliott
 the Minister for Women's Safety and the Prevention of Domestic and Sexual Violence, currently Natalie Ward
 the Minister for Corrections, currently Geoff Lee
 the Minister for Families and Communities and Minister for Disability Services, currently Natasha Maclaren-Jones
 the Minister for Emergency Services and Resilience, currently Steph Cooke
 the Minister for Multiculturalism and Minister for Seniors, currently Mark Coure and
 the Minister for Regional Youth, currently Ben Franklin.

The attorney general and the Ministers administer the portfolio through the Stronger Communities cluster, in particular the Department of Communities and Justice and a range of other government agencies. 

Ultimately, the attorney general and the Ministers are responsible to the Parliament of New South Wales.

History and function
The position of Attorney General has existed since 1824, well before the full establishment of the New South Wales Parliament (in 1856) but coinciding with the establishment of the New South Wales Legislative Council. From the beginning, the attorney general has been the Crown's advisor and representative in legal matters. It was modelled after the office of the Attorney General for England and Wales. As such the attorney general advises and represents the Crown and government departments in court. The person appointed to this role provides legal advice to the Government, acts as the representative of the public interest and resolves issues between government departments.

The attorney general also has supervisory powers over the prosecution of criminal offences, but is not personally involved with prosecutions. Today, prosecutions are carried out by the Public Prosecution Office and most legal advice to government departments is provided by the Government Legal Service, both under the supervision of the attorney general. The attorney general may appeal cases to the higher courts where, although the particular case is settled, there may be a point of law of public importance at issue. The attorney general is responsible to Parliament for activities of the Department of Justice and has responsibility for the all state's courts and tribunals and the appointment of judges, magistrates and statutory officers in New South Wales.

List of ministers

Attorneys general 
The following individuals have served as Attorney General of New South Wales:

See also 

List of New South Wales government agencies

References

External links
NSW Department of Justice

Attorneys General of New South Wales
Attorney
New South Wales